Ashfield is a hamlet in Shropshire, England.

Maesbury Primary School is located here.

References

External links

Hamlets in Shropshire